Muschamp is a surname first found in Northumberland, where they held a family seat. Notable people with the surname include:

Will Muschamp (born August 3, 1971), American football coach
Herbert Muschamp (1947–2007), American architecture critic
Cecil Muschamp (1902-1984), Anglican bishop
Geoffrey de Muschamp (died 1208), medieval Bishop of Coventry
Emerson Muschamp Bainbridge (1845-1911),  English engineer, philanthropist and politician